Roy Webb (3 October 1888 – 10 December 1982) was an American film music composer. Webb has hundreds of film music credits to his name, mainly with RKO Pictures.

Webb orchestrated and conducted for the Broadway stage, before moving to Hollywood in the late 1920s to work as music director for Radio Pictures, later RKO Pictures. He remained at RKO until 1955, then worked freelance for several years, including scoring several episodes of Wagon Train. Webb is credited as composer or arranger on more than 200 films, and received Academy Award nominations for Quality Street (1937), My Favorite Wife (1940), I Married a Witch (1942), Joan of Paris (1942), The Fallen Sparrow (1943), The Fighting Seabees (1944), and The Enchanted Cottage (1945).

Filmography
(as per AFI's database)

References

American filmographies